Chhunly Pagenburg (born 10 November 1986) is a German-born Cambodian former professional footballer who played as a striker.

Career
In 2011, Pagenburg was the highest paid athlete (along with Thun Sophea) from Cambodia, making $30,000 (USD).

Pagenburg was invited to the Cambodia national football team in 2010 by a journalist looking for players abroad.

In October 2013, he made two appearances appearance for Cambodia U-23 to play against Svay Rieng ad Phnom Penh Crown but he wasn't eligible to play for Cambodia U-23 at Sea Game 2013 because of overage. He made his senior international debut on 19 November 2013 in a friendly match against Guam.

He announced his retirement from professional football in February 2015 at the age of 28 due to chronic injury.

Honours
1. FC Nürnberg
 DFB-Pokal: 2006–07

References

External links

Living people
1986 births
Footballers from Nuremberg
Association football forwards
German footballers
Germany youth international footballers
Bundesliga players
2. Bundesliga players
3. Liga players
SpVgg Greuther Fürth players
1. FC Nürnberg II players
1. FC Nürnberg players
TSV 1860 Munich players
TSV 1860 Munich II players
FC Rot-Weiß Erfurt players
SV Eintracht Trier 05 players
FSV Frankfurt players
Cambodian footballers
Cambodia international footballers
German people of Cambodian descent